Pratap University  is a Private university located in Jaipur, Rajasthan, India. It was founded in 2011.

Notable alumni
 Nishikant Dubey

References

External links

Universities and colleges in Jaipur
Universities in Rajasthan
Private universities in India
2011 establishments in Rajasthan
Educational institutions established in 2011